Elektronika is a monthly peer-reviewed scientific journal published by the Association of Polish Electrical Engineers. It covers various topics in electronics, communications, photonics, and optics. The journal cooperates with the IEEE Poland Section, Polish Academy of Sciences, and the Photonics Society of Poland. It is abstracted and indexed in Scopus and INSPEC. The journal contains the following sections: electronics, communications, materials research, optical technology, information processing, lasers, photonics, and information technology.

References

External links
 

Electrical and electronic engineering journals
Optics journals
Publications established in 1959
Monthly journals
Electronics journals
Academic journals published by learned and professional societies
Multilingual journals
Academic journals published in Poland